ACT for Mental Health, Inc. is a non-profit human services agency in downtown San Jose, California. ACT is a recipient of Jefferson Awards for Public Service. For more than 50 years ACT has been serving underserved communities with no-cost or low-cost social services without government funding primarily on donations.

Organization history 
The organization was founded in 1956. For over 50 years ACT for Mental Health has been relieving obstacles to emotional well-being and by restoring and enhancing strengths through acceptance in a safe, stable and professionally guided environment which provides tools and support for resolution of personal, emotional and situational life problems.

Focus areas

Notes

Organizations established in 1956
Organizations based in San Jose, California
Non-profit organizations based in California
1956 establishments in California
Healthcare in the San Francisco Bay Area